Jack Rollins may refer to:

Jack Rollins (producer) (1915–2015), long-time producer of Woody Allen's films
Walter E. Rollins (1906–1973), American songwriter, nicknamed "Jack"

Fictional characters
Jack Rollins (Marvel Cinematic Universe), a character in the Marvel Cinematic Universe franchise

See also
John Rollins (disambiguation)